The West Cork Chamber Music Festival is a music festival, established in 1995, in the town of Bantry in West Cork, Ireland. It usually occurs in July.

Performers
The festival's performers have included the RTÉ Vanbrugh Quartet, Barry Douglas, Nicola Benedetti, Tanja Becker-Bender and Natalie Clein. Presented works have included some by contemporary composers, such as Thomas Larcher.

Venues and activities 

Performances take place at venues around the town, including Bantry House and St Brendan's Church. Bantry House is the central venue; its drawing room has a capacity of about 50.

The festival has included presentations on violin and bow making, master classes, and composition competitions whose past winners include Harry Whalley, Sebastian Adams and Solfa Carlisle. It has also held competitions for young composers.

References 

Bantry
Music festivals in Ireland
Classical music festivals in Ireland
Tourist attractions in County Cork
Chamber music festivals